Usagi Yojimbo Book 25: Fox Hunt is the twenty-fifth graphic novel in the ongoing Usagi Yojimbo series created by cartoonist Stan Sakai. It was published by Dark Horse Comics in 2011, collecting stories previously published in Usagi Yojimbo (vol. 3) #110 – 116 and a story from MySpace Dark Horse Presents #18.

The story Saya was initially published digitally in the 18th installment of the "MySpace Dark Horse Presents" on-line publication in January 2009. The story was then printed in the Myspace Dark Horse Presents #3 trade paperback compilation in August 2009.

Fox Hunt was published in trade paperback and limited edition hardcover (limited to 350 signed and numbered copies).

Publication details

Trade Paperback Edition 

Publication Date: July 6, 2011

Format: b&w, 192 pages, TPB, 

Price: $16.99

Signed & Numbered Limited Hardcover Edition 

Publication Date: July 6, 2011

Format: b&w, 192 pages, Ltd. HC, 

Price: $59.99

Table of Contents 

 Introduction - Floyd Norman
 Kitsune Gari
 Sakura
 Snitch
 Saya
 The Begger
 The Fortress
 The Outlaw
 Story Notes
 Cover Gallery
 Author Bio

Foreign Language Editions

Usagi Yojimbo 25: Polowanie na lisa 

Publisher: Egmont Polska Sp. z o.o.

Publication Date: Listopad 2012

Language: Polish

Usagi Yojimbo nº 25: La caza del zorro 

Publisher: Planeta DeAgostini

Publication Date: Octubre 2012

Language: Spanish

Usagi Yojimbo Tome 25 

Publisher: Paquet

Publication Date: Mai 2013

Language: French

Format: 12,5 x 18,5 cm

The Digest sized French editions of the Usagi Yojimbo books do not feature any of the individual compilation titles that are used for the original English editions, listing each book by volume number instead.

References

2013 graphic novels
Usagi Yojimbo